Euchlaenidia wirthi is a moth of the family Erebidae. It was described by Schaus in 1933. It is found in Venezuela.

References

Euchlaenidia
Moths described in 1933